Pterolophia omeishana is a species of beetle in the family Cerambycidae. It was described by Gressitt in 1945.

References

omeishana
Beetles described in 1945